Diascia is a genus of around 70 species of herbaceous annual and perennial flowering plants of the family Scrophulariaceae, native to southern Africa, including South Africa, Lesotho and neighbouring areas.

The perennial species are found mainly in summer-rainfall areas such as the KwaZulu-Natal Drakensberg; about 50 species, mostly annuals, are found in the Western Cape and Namaqualand, winter rainfall areas.

Their common name is twinspur, in reference to the two (usually downward-pointing) spurs to be found on the back of the flower. These help to distinguish them from the similar (and closely related) genera Alonsoa and Nemesia. The spurs contain a special oil, which is collected in the wild by bees of the genus Rediviva (e.g. R. longimanus) that appear to have coevolved with the plants, as they have unusually long forelegs for collecting the oil.

In gardens, Diascia cultivars (mostly hybrids) have become extremely popular as colourful, floriferous, easily grown bedding plants in recent years.

Etymology
Surprisingly, the generic name (from the Greek di = two and askos = bag, pouch or sack) does not refer to the spurs, but to the two translucent sacs, or pouches, known as 'windows', found in the upper part of the corolla of the original type specimen, Diascia bergiana. Diascia species in the section Racemosae have similar windows, but in some species they merge into one. The windows may help oil-collecting bees to find the correct position within the corolla when gathering oil from the glands within the spurs.

Description
Some Diascia species spread by means of stolons, while others produce multiple lax stems from a single crown. The flowers are borne in loose terminal racemes. The corolla is five-lobed, and normally pink or rose-coloured in the perennial species most commonly seen in cultivation. Dark purplish patches of oil glands may make the flowers of some species appear bicoloured.

Species
Around 60–70 species are currently recognised in the genus Diascia:

Diascia aliciae Hiern
Diascia alonzoides Benth.
Diascia anastrepta Hilliard & B.L.Burtt
Diascia ausana Dinter
Diascia austromontana K.E.Steiner
Diascia barberae Hook.f.
Diascia batteniana K.E.Steiner
Diascia bergiana Link & Otto
Diascia bicolor K.E.Steiner
Diascia capensis (L.) Britten
Diascia capsularis Benth.
Diascia cardiosepala Hiern
Diascia cordata N.E.Br.
Diascia cuneata E.Mey. ex Benth.
Diascia decipiens K.E.Steiner
Diascia dielsiana Schltr. ex Hiern
Diascia diffusa Benth.
Diascia dissecta Hiern
Diascia dissimulans Hilliard & B.L.Burtt
Diascia ellaphieae K.E.Steiner
Diascia elongata Benth.
Diascia engleri Diels
Diascia esterhuyseniae K.E.Steiner
Diascia fetcaniensis Hilliard & B.L.Burtt
Diascia fragrans K.E.Steiner
Diascia glandulosa E.Phillips
Diascia gracilis Schltr.
Diascia heterandra Benth.
Diascia hexensis K.E.Steiner
Diascia humilis K.E.Steiner
Diascia insignis K.E.Steiner
Diascia integerrima E.Mey. ex Benth.
Diascia lewisiae K.E.Steiner
Diascia lilacina Hilliard & B.L.Burtt
Diascia longicornis (Thunb.) Druce
Diascia macrophylla (Thunb.) Spreng.
Diascia maculata K.E.Steiner
Diascia megathura Hilliard & B.L.Burtt
Diascia minutiflora Hiern
Diascia mollis Hilliard & B.L.Burtt
Diascia namaquensis Hiern
Diascia nana Diels
Diascia nodosa K.E.Steiner
Diascia nutans Diels
Diascia pachyceras E.Mey. ex Benth.
Diascia parviflora Benth.
Diascia patens (Thunb.) Grant ex Fourc.
Diascia pentheri Schltr.
Diascia personata Hilliard & B.L.Burtt
Diascia purpurea N.E.Br.
Diascia racemulosa Benth.
Diascia ramosa Scott-Elliot
Diascia rigescens E.Mey. ex Benth.
Diascia rudolphii Hiern
Diascia runcinata E.Mey. ex Benth.
Diascia sacculata Benth.
Diascia scullyi Hiern
Diascia stachyoides Schltr. ex Hiern
Diascia stricta Hilliard & B.L.Burtt
Diascia tanyceras E.Mey. ex Benth.
Diascia tugelensis Hilliard & B.L.Burtt
Diascia unilabiata (Thunb.) Benth.
Diascia veronicoides Schltr.
Diascia vigilis Hilliard & B.L.Burtt

Coevolution with Rediviva bees
The two spurs found on the back of a Diascia flower (from which it gets the common name twinspur) contain a special oil, which is collected in the wild by at least 8 species of bees of the genus Rediviva. The bees appear to have coevolved with the plants, as the females have developed unusually long, hairy forelegs with which they collect the oil from Diascia spurs to feed their larvae (and sometimes to line their nests with). Rediviva longimanus has also been observed pollinating D. longicornis in the Western Cape.

Rediviva neliana, a widespread species, collects from at least 12 species of Diascia, but in general, few different Diascia species grow together in the same locality. As a result, local populations of R. neliana have been found to differ from each other, as each has developed legs that match the spur length of the diascias that are available to them in that locality. This indicates that local populations of R. neliana are coevolving with the flowers on which they depend.

Garden uses

Diascia cultivars have become extremely popular worldwide as bedding plants, suitable for hanging baskets, window boxes and other containers, as well as rockeries and the fronts of herbaceous borders. This explosion of interest is largely thanks to the breeding work done by the late Hector Harrison of Appleby, North Lincolnshire, England. From 1985, he raised hundreds of hybrid seedlings, from which several excellent cultivars have been selected and named. He increased the colour range to include shades of apricot, pink, coral, lilac, red and white. Other nurseries and breeders have continued to build on his pioneering work.

Several species and cultivars have been given the Award of Garden Merit by the British Royal Horticultural Society. The AGM includes a hardiness rating: most have been rated as intermediate between H3 (hardy outside in some regions or particular situations or which, while usually grown outside in summer, needs frost-free protection in winter – e.g. dahlias) and H4 (hardy throughout the British Isles).

Cultivars
The species and cultivars commonly grown in gardens include the following (those awarded the Royal Horticultural Society's Award of Garden Merit are marked ):

'Appleby Apricot'
D. barberae:
'Belmore Beauty'
'Blackthorn Apricot'  H3-4
'Fisher's Flora'  
'Ruby Field'  H3–4
'Blue Bonnet'
='Hecbel'  H3–4
'Dark Eyes'  
'Elizabeth'  
D. fetcaniensis
Flying Colours Series
'Flying Colours Appleblossom'
'Flying Colours Apricot'
'Flying Colours Coral'
'Flying Colours Red'
'Ice Cracker'
'Ice Cream'
D. integerrima  
'Jacqueline's Joy'
'Joyce's Choice'  H3–4
'Katherine Sharman'
'Lady Valerie'  H3–4
'Lilac Belle'  H3–4
'Lilac Mist'  H3–4
'Little Dancer'
'Little Tango'
'Pink Panther'
'Red Ace'
'Redstart'
D. rigescens  
'Rupert Lambert'  H3–4
'Salmon Supreme'
'Twinkle'  
D. vigilis  
Whisper Series
'Whisper Apricot Improved'
'Whisper Cranberry Red'
'Whisper Pumpkin'
'Whisper Tangerine'
'Whisper White'
Wink Series
'Wink Garnet'

References

External links

 PlantZAfrica.com Diascia integerrima
 PlantZAfrica.com Diascia rigescens
 A UK National Plant Collection holder's website

Scrophulariaceae
Scrophulariaceae genera